Anke Brockmann (born 19 August 1988 in Berlin) is a German field hockey player. At the 2012 Summer Olympics, she competed for the Germany women's national field hockey team in the women's event.

References

External links
 
 
 
 

1988 births
Living people
German female field hockey players
Olympic field hockey players of Germany
Field hockey players at the 2012 Summer Olympics
21st-century German women